The Men's 50m Free Rifle 3x40 SH1 shooting event at the 2004 Summer Paralympics was competed  on 21 September. It was won by Jonas Jacobsson, representing .

Preliminary

21 Sept. 2004, 11:00

Final round

21 Sept. 2004, 16:00

References

M